Rubus recurvans is a North American species of highbush blackberry in section Arguti of the genus Rubus, a member of the rose family. It is found in eastern and central Canada (Québec, Ontario, Nova Scotia) and in the eastern and north-central United States (from Maine west to Minnesota, south as far as Missouri, the Ohio River, and Virginia). It is commonly known as recurved blackberry, referring to the habit of the first-year canes that grow upright before recurving rather than forming a distinct arch.

References

recurvans
Plants described in 1904
Flora of Canada
Flora of the United States